The Triennial Convention (so-called because it met every three years) was the first national Baptist denomination in the United States. Officially named the General Missionary Convention of the Baptist Denomination in the United States of America for Foreign Missions, it was formed in 1814 to advance missionary work and headquartered in Philadelphia, Pennsylvania. In a dispute over slavery and missions policy, Baptist churches in the South separated from the Triennial Convention and established the Southern Baptist Convention in 1845. This split left the Triennial Convention largely Northern in membership. In 1907, the Triennial Convention was reorganized into the Northern Baptist Convention, which was renamed American Baptist Churches USA in 1972.

History

Background
Distinguished from other churches by their commitment to believer's baptism, congregational autonomy and the separation of church and state, Baptists have been present in the United States since Roger Williams founded the First Baptist Church in America at Providence, Rhode Island, in 1638. Baptist churches were soon found elsewhere in colonial America. The First Baptist Church of Boston was founded in 1665, and Pennepack Baptist Church in Philadelphia, Pennsylvania, was organized in 1688. The founding of First Baptist Church of Charleston, South Carolina in the late 1690s marked the spread of Baptists to the South.
 
In the 18th and 19th centuries, Baptists began forming regional associations and societies to foster cooperation in missionary, benevolent, and educational work. The voluntary nature of these associations was consistent with Baptist belief in the autonomy of local congregations. Associations could determine their own standards for fellowship and offer advice to churches, but local congregations governed themselves and ordained their own ministers. The first permanent Baptist association in America was the Philadelphia Association, established in 1707.

The Second Great Awakening inspired the establishment of foreign missions agencies to spread the Christian religion throughout the world. In 1810, the Congregationalists established the American Board of Commissioners for Foreign Missions. Two years later, the Congregationalist Board sent Adoniram Judson, Jr. (1788–1850), Ann Hasseltine Judson (1789–1826), and Luther Rice to India. Upon arrival, however, the three missionaries repudiated infant baptism and became Baptists under the influence of British missionary William Carey (1761–1834), a founder of Britain's Baptist Missionary Society.

Organization and growth
Carey and the three American missionaries mobilized Baptists in America to support the Judsons' planned mission trip to Burma. Their efforts led to the creation in 1814 of the General Missionary Convention of the Baptist Denomination in the United States of America for Foreign Missions. The Convention was tasked with collecting funds from Baptist groups and individuals to support foreign missions. The Convention was called "Triennial" because the national convention met every three years. Members of the denomination were called American Baptists or Triennial Baptists. At its first meeting, the American Baptist Missionary Union for foreign missions was created, and the denomination sent missionaries to China, Africa, and South America. Additional state or regional Baptist conventions were formed along with other societies, such as the Baptist General Tract Society (later renamed the American Baptist Publication Society) in 1824 and the Home Mission Society in 1832. The various societies held their own conventions during sessions of the Triennial Convention.

By 1840, Baptists were in every state and territory as well as missions around the world. Alongside the Methodists, Baptists had grown to be one of the two largest denominations in the United States. Nevertheless, there were Baptists who opposed efforts to establish missions boards and denominational agencies as unbiblical. These Baptists became known as "anti-mission" or Primitive Baptists, while those who supported organized missionary work became known as Missionary Baptists. As early as 1838, African-American Baptists began organizing their own associations and conventions. Immigrants, such as Danish, Norwegian, Swedish and German Americans, also formed their own Baptist denominations along ethnic lines rather than affiliate with the Anglo-American oriented Triennial Convention.

Southern Baptist split
The Triennial Convention attempted to take no stated position on slavery. This moderate position allowed both abolitionists and slavery supporters to remain in the denomination.  The majority of Triennial Baptists in the Northeast opposed slavery, while the growing number of Triennial Baptists in the Southeast supported slavery.

In 1843, the abolitionists in the Northeast founded the Northern Baptist Mission Society in opposition to slavery. In 1844, the Home Mission Society refused to ordain James E. Reeve of Georgia as a missionary because he was put forward as a slaveholder.  They refused to decide on the basis of slavery. In May 1845, in Augusta, Georgia, the slavery supporters in the Southeast broke with the Triennial Convention and founded the Southern Baptist Convention.  The Triennial Baptists were  concentrated in the Northeast. The abolitionists in the Northeast inherited the Triennial Convention and the Northern Baptist Mission Society was dissolved. After the split, authorization was given to change the name  to the American Baptist Missionary Union. William Bullein Johnson joined the Southern Baptists.

Later history
During the late 19th and early 20th centuries, the Triennial Convention took no official position on Evolution. This moderate position accepted the Bible and science and allowed both Fundamentalists and liberals to remain in the denomination, but it also contradicted the New Hampshire Confession and the Bible. The liberals in the urban Northeast accepted the position, while the Fundamentalists in the rural Northeast rejected the position but remained in the Triennial Convention. The Triennial Baptists supported Progressivism and the Social Gospel, but not the more radical ideas of Walter Rauschenbusch (1861–1918) and other Christian Socialists. In 1888, the Triennial Convention founded the American Baptist Education Society to organize support for affiliated schools, colleges, and seminaries.

On May 17, 1907 in Washington, D.C., the Triennial Convention organized the American Baptist Education Society, the American Baptist Home Mission Society, the American Baptist Missionary Union, and the American Baptist Publication Society into a new Northern Baptist Convention. Governor of New York, Charles Evans Hughes (April 11, 1862 – August 27, 1948, served since 1907) (Republican) was elected the first Northern Baptist Convention president, but he continued his job as Governor. 29th President of the United States, Warren Gamaliel Harding (November 2, 1865 – August 2, 1923, served March 4, 1921 – August 2, 1923) (Republican) was a Baptist by upbringing, faith, and self-identification, but he was a member of the Masonic Lodge. The Northern Baptist Convention was renamed the American Baptist Convention in 1950, and the American Baptist Churches, USA in 1972.

Beliefs
The Triennial Convention accepted the 1742 Philadelphia Baptist Confession of Faith. This confession was adapted from an earlier English confession, the Second London Baptist Confession of 1689. The Second London Confession was a Reformed Baptist document influenced heavily by the Westminster Confession of Faith. The Philadelphia Confession differed from the Second London Confession only by the addition of two articles. One of the new articles allowed the singing of hymns as well as the traditional Psalms. The other made laying on of hands at baptism optional. The Philadelphia Confession affirmed the following:
 authority of the Bible,
 Lordship of Jesus Christ,
 Congregationalist polity,
 necessity of a conversion experience and a believer's baptism by immersion, and
 evangelism and missionary outreach.

The Triennial Convention accepted the 1833 New Hampshire Baptist Confession of Faith. The Confession was drafted by Rev. John Newton Brown, D.D. (1803–1868), of New Hampshire and other Triennial Baptist ministers, and adopted by the New Hampshire (Triennial) Baptist Convention. The Confession was traditional. The controversy of the day was free will versus predestination. While the New Hampshire Confession is shorter than the 1742 Philadelphia Confession, it affirms the Philadelphia Confession. The New Hampshire Confession states that "[Humans] by voluntary [free will] transgression fell from the holy and happy state [they were created]" and that "We believe that Election [predestination] is the eternal purpose of God, according to which he graciously regenerates, sanctifies, and saves sinners". However, many saw the New Hampshire Confession as accepting free will. The free-will Baptists in the Northeast and West accepted the Confession, while the Calvinist (predestination) Baptists in the Southeast rejected the Confession but remained in the Triennial Convention.

Notable members
 John Newton Brown, early 19th century church reformer
 James Boorman Colgate
 Samuel Colgate, religious leader and President of the Colgate Company
 William Colgate, founder of the Colgate Company
 Charles Evans Hughes,  11th Chief Justice of the United States, first president of the Northern Baptist Convention in 1907
 William Bullein Johnson, Triennial Convention President in 1841, he became a Southern Baptist in 1845
 Adoniram Judson, early 19th century missionary to Burma
 Ann Hasseltine Judson, early 19th century missionary to Burma
 John D. Rockefeller, industrialist
 Laura Spelman Rockefeller, philanthropist
 Francis Wayland, educator and pastor, president of Brown University and abolitionist

References

Bibliography
 Louis H. Everts. The Baptist Encyclopedia. Vol. 2. Ed. William Cathcart. Philadelphia: Louis H. Everts, 1883.
 Snay, Mitchell. Gospel of Disunion: Religion and Separatism in the Antebellum South. New York: Cambridge University Press, 1993.

External links
 1742 Philadelphia Baptist Confession of Faith
 1833 New Hampshire Baptist Confession of Faith

American Baptist Churches USA
Baptist denominations in North America
Religious organizations established in 1814
1814 establishments in the United States